Dumesnil ("from the cottage") is a French surname. Notable people with the surname include:

 Bryan Dumesnil (born 1983), Canadian pitcher
 Cheryl Dumesnil (born 1969), American poet and editor
 Louis Gaulard Dumesnil (died 1702), French operatic tenor
 Marie Dumesnil (1713–1803), French actress
 Pierre Louis Dumesnil (1698–1781), French painter who specialized in genre scenes
 Suzanne Dechevaux-Dumesnil (1900–1989), tennis-partner, lover and later wife of Samuel Beckett
 Jacques Dumesnil (1904–1998), French film and television actor
 Jacques-Louis Dumesnil (1882–1956), French politician

See also
 Peterson-Dumesnil House, a Victorian-Italianate house in the Crescent Hill neighborhood of Louisville, Kentucky, United States
 Saint-Pierre-du-Mesnil, a commune in the Eure department in Haute-Normandie in northern France
 Dumesny

French-language surnames